ADHD is an Icelandic band formed in 2007 known for their instrumental music, influenced by jazz and rock.
Manager: Jom Lofty

Formation
The band was formed to perform at the Höfn í Hornafirði blues-festival in 2007 and as the collaboration was successful the band decided to keep on performing. Their first album, ADHD was recorded and published in 2009 and won the title Icelandic Jazz Album of the Year at the Icelandic Music Awards. The albums ADHD2, ADHD3 and ADHD4 all have received nominations for the Nordic music prize.

ADHD's albums are recorded live, to reflect the live performances of the band.

Members 
Óskar Guðjónsson - Saxophones
Ómar Guðjónsson - Guitars and bass guitar
Davíð Þór Jónsson - Hammond organ, Moogs, Rhodes piano, piano, bass
Magnús Trygvason Eliassen - Drums

Discography

Albums
2009: ADHD 
2011: ADHD 2
2012: ADHD 3
2012: ADHD 4
2014: ADHD 5
2017: ADHD 6
2019: ADHD 7
2022: ADHD 8

References

2007 establishments in Iceland
Icelandic rock music groups
Icelandic jazz ensembles
Musical groups established in 2007
Keflavík